Prasophyllum stygium, commonly known as the elfin leek orchid, is a species of orchid endemic to Victoria. It has a single tube-shaped leaf and up to twenty greenish-brown flowers with a white labellum. It is a recently described plant, previously included with P. fitzgeraldii, but distinguished from that species by its greenish-brown flowers with their white labellum and narrower brown callus. It is only known from a single population of about thirty plants.

Description
As with others in the genus, the flowers are inverted so that the labellum is above the column rather than below it. The edges of the upturned part are wavy or crinkled with hair-like papillae. There is a raised, oblong, coffee-coloured callus in the centre of the labellum and extending almost to its tip. Flowering occurs in late October or early November and only lasts a few days.

Taxonomy and naming
Prasophyllum stygium was first formally described in 2017 by David Jones and Dean Rouse and the description was published in Australian Orchid Review from a specimen collected in the Deep Lead Nature Conservation Reserve near Stawell. The specific epithet (stygium) is a Latin word meaning "stygian" after the mythological river Styx, referring to the type location, a former mining area where gold was extracted from buried river beds.

Distribution and habitat
The elfin leek orchid is only known from about thirty plants growing in forest at the type location.

References

External links 
 

stygium
Flora of Victoria (Australia)
Plants described in 2017
Endemic orchids of Australia